Konopki may refer to the following places:
Konopki, Gmina Grajewo in Podlaskie Voivodeship (north-east Poland)
Konopki, Gmina Radziłów in Podlaskie Voivodeship (north-east Poland)
Konopki, Suwałki County in Podlaskie Voivodeship (north-east Poland)
Konopki, Masovian Voivodeship (east-central Poland)
Konopki, Warmian-Masurian Voivodeship (north Poland)